The Or Torah or Djerba Synagogue is a Tunisian synagogue in Acre, Israel, built after the El Ghriba synagogue on Djerba. The building was erected in 1955.

The building is covered with millions of mosaics inside which have been manufactured at Kibbutz Eilon. The building has 140 stained glass windows and a dome.

See also
 History of the Jews in Tunisia

External links
 Goisrael: The Torah Synagogue

Sources
Go Israel

Synagogues in Israel
Sephardi Jewish culture in Israel
Sephardi synagogues
Buildings and structures in Acre, Israel
Synagogues completed in 1955
Tunisian-Jewish culture in Israel
1955 establishments in Israel
Synagogue buildings with domes